Pseudacraea clarkii, or Clark's false acraea, is a butterfly in the family Nymphalidae. It is found in Nigeria, Cameroon, Gabon, the Republic of the Congo, the Democratic Republic of the Congo and western Uganda.

Description
. 
Ps. clarki Btlr. (46 b). Upperside of the forewing bright yellow-red in the cell nearly to its apex  and in cellules l-3 as far as the black marginal band, which is 3 mm. in breadth, a thick black longitudinal stripe in the cell and in each of the cellules named; the apical half is blackish, at the apex itself broadly black, usually with a broad reddish subapical band in cellules 4-6 and black longitudinal streaks on the folds; hindwing bright yellow-red above with large, more or less confluent black spots at the base and a sharply defined black marginal band 2-3 mm. in breadth, which sometimes encloses indistinct light spots; black longitudinal streaks are absent or are very short; the inner margin is whitish in cellules 1 a and 1 b; the under surface is much lighter, the hindwing light grey or whitish with distinct streaks on the interneural folds and free basal  spots. Recalls Acraea orinata (57 a). Cameroons to the Congo. -ab. egina Auriv. (= eginoides A. Schultze) only differs in having the forewing black in the basal part also, only behind the middle with a red half-band,  extending from the hindmargin to the middle of cellule 3. Recalls Acraea egina (54 d). Cameroons and Congo.

Biology
The habitat consists of forests.

References

Butterflies described in 1892
Limenitidinae
Butterflies of Africa